Farmor's School is a secondary school with academy status in Fairford, Gloucestershire. Including the Sixth Form, the school currently has about 1,000 students on roll.

After receiving an inspection from Ofsted in 2017, the school was given a 'Requires Improvement' classification. The 6th Form also received the same classification.

The school is aided by the Elizabeth Farmor Trust, founded in 2008. The trust assists the school by "advancing the education of the pupils at the school". For example, in 2011, the trust helped fund new computer hardware for the school.

History

The school was founded in 1738, using a gift of £500 by Miss Mary Barker and a bequest of £1,000 by Miss Elizabeth Farmor. The original site of the school was next to St Mary's Church on the High Street - the current location of the Community Centre. When it first opened, the school was called Fairford Free School and accepted 60 boys aged 5–12 from the town of Fairford.  In 1817, children from outside Fairford were admitted, but had to pay fees, and the school began to accept girls in a separate section of the school and hired a mistress to teach them. The master of the school in 1866 was dismissed on grounds of neglect. In 1877 the school benefited when a charity set up 200 years before by Jane Mico for apprentices in Fairford was merged into the school.

The school's name in 1904 was Farmor's Endowed School, and it became co-educational in 1922, and the sections were combined under a single headmaster. It moved to its current location in 1961, and became an 11 to 18 Comprehensive School in 1966.

In 2020, the school was taken to court over unfair dismissal of a member of staff due to her religious beliefs about LGBT+ people in Higgs v Farmor's School.

Specialist School

In 2004 the School became a Business and Enterprise Specialist School. In 2007 the school was named a High Performing Specialist School and as a result of this it became a Science Specialist School. A more recent inspection in 2017 again downgraded the schools Ofsted rating from 'Good' to 'Requires Improvement'.

Academy Conversion
In August 2011 the school, after a consultation, applied for and gained Academy status. The move came at a time when many schools across the county were converting.

Academies Capital Maintenance Fund
In 2013, the school was awarded a grant totalling nearly £1 million pounds by the Academies Capital Maintenance fund. The grants were used to complete the schools flat roof repairs and build a new sixth form learning centre. The existing sixth form was re-decorated during the construction of the new extension, which was completed in 2014.

Exam results
In 2012, 79% of GCSE students achieved 5 or more A* to C grades. At A-level, 81% received A* to C Grades.

In 2013, both GCSE and A-level results rose in comparison with the previous year, with 89.5% of GCSE students achieving 5 or more A* to C grades. At A-level, 85% received A* to C Grades.

References 

Academies in Gloucestershire
Secondary schools in Gloucestershire
Fairford